Dissolved and Effused is a 1985 Czechoslovak comedy film directed by Ladislav Smoljak.

Storyline

At the end of the Austro-Hungarian Empire, police investigator Trachta and his trainee, Hlaváček, investigate the murder of the factory owner Bierhanzl, who used duck eggs to make a miraculous ointment against baldness and mysteriously disappeared just as he was organising a large party in his villa. The clues uncovered show that he was ingeniously murdered: as the film's title suggests, he was apparently dissolved in a bathtube using sulphuric acid and his remains were dumped down the drain. Trachta and Hlaváček, in their an original way of investigation, discover (despite constant interference from the police director) that in fact quite different crimes have been committed, that the murder is only a blame, and that the supposedly drained factory owner Bierhanzel is alive, with only minor damage to his beauty. Hlaváček even manages to fall happily in love...

External links
 

1985 comedy films
1985 films
Czechoslovak comedy films
Films directed by Ladislav Smoljak
Czech comedy films
Czech detective films
Films with screenplays by Zdeněk Svěrák
1980s Czech films